Lieutenant General Thomas Farrington (1664 – 7 October 1712) was a British Army officer and politician who sat in the English and British House of Commons from 1705 to 1712. He raised the 29th (Worcestershire) Regiment of Foot.

Early life
Farrington was the only son of Thomas Farrington of St Andrew Undershaft, London and Chislehurst, and his wife Mary Smith, daughter of John Smith of St Mary Aldermanbury, London and South Tidworth, Hampshire.

He married by licence dated 16 August 1687 (with £3,000), Theodosia Bettenson, daughter of Richard Bettenson son of Sir Richard Bettenson, 1st Baronet, of Wimbledon, Surrey and Scadbury Park, Chislehurst. He succeeded his father in 1694.

Military career
Farrington was commissioned into the 2nd Regiment of Footguards as a captain on 31 December 1688. He raised the 29th (Worcestershire) Regiment of Foot in 1694.

Later career
Farrington was returned as Member of Parliament for Malmesbury at the 1705 English general election and was returned again at the 1708 British general election and at the 1710 British general election. He did not stand at the 1713 election. He was later promoted to major-general.

Farrington died on 7 October 1712.

References

 

|-

1664 births
1712 deaths
British Army lieutenant generals
English MPs 1705–1707
British MPs 1707–1708
British MPs 1708–1710
British MPs 1710–1713
Coldstream Guards officers
29th Regiment of Foot officers